The Invincible Squad (Simplified Chinese: 迷幻特警) is Singaporean Chinese police drama series which aired on MediaCorp Channel 8 in 2001. It is about a police special task force who are called to solve six difficult cases.

Main cast
Xie Shaoguang
Phyllis Quek
Jeff Wang

Nominations

Synopsis
The series contains six short stories, each focusing on mysterious and unusual cases that require a special team to help solve.

The head of the force is a person named "Z", who once had a bright future with the police force. His career with the police was cut short when his wife disappeared, under mysterious circumstances, causing him to enter depression. Also in the task force is Si Feng, a person with an unhappy childhood, and Zi Ling, a psychic who has a crush on Z.

See also
List of programmes broadcast by Mediacorp Channel 8

External links
 
 The Invincible Squad on MediaCorp website

Singapore Chinese dramas
Singaporean crime television series